On 2 May 2019, an election took place to elect members of the North Warwickshire Borough Council in England. It was held on the same day as other local elections in the UK. It resulted in the Conservative Party retaining control of the council.

Both the Conservative and Labour parties saw increases in their vote share, especially the former, which was likely due to UKIP losing nearly 20% of their vote share. The Conservatives lost one seat to Labour but still retained a majority of seats.

Summary

Election result

|-

Ward results

Arley and Whitacre

Atherstone Central

Atherstone North

Atherstone South and Mancetter

Baddesley and Grendon

Coleshill North

Coleshill South

Curdworth

Dordon

Fillongley

Hartshill

Hurley and Wood End

Kingsbury

Newton Regis and Warton

Polesworth East

Polesworth West

Water Orton

References

2019 English local elections
May 2019 events in the United Kingdom
2019
2010s in Warwickshire